Zinc finger BED domain-containing protein 3 also known as axin-interacting protein is a protein in humans that is encoded by the ZBED3 gene.

References

Further reading